Ingrid Matthäus-Maier (born 9 September 1945 in Werlte) is a German politician of the Social Democratic Party of Germany (SPD).

Life 
In her childhood she lived in Mülheim and went to school in Duisburg. Since 1969 she was a member of JungdemokratInnen/Junge Linke. From 1976 to 1999 Matthäus-Maier was a member of the German Bundestag. First she was a member of German politician party FDP. In 1982, she changed to German party SPD.

After she left the Bundestag, Matthäus-Maier became a member of the Board of directors at Kreditanstalt für Wiederaufbau (KfW).
She is married with mathematician Robert Maier and has two sons.

References

External links 

 
 Interview with Wolther von Kieseritzky (Archiv des Liberalismus) with Matthäus-Maier at „Lüdenscheider Gespräche“ by FernUniversität in Hagen
 Deutschlandfunk: Zeitzeugen im Gespräch, April 26, 2018: Für mich ist der Abgeordnete die Nummer eins

Members of the Bundestag for the Social Democratic Party of Germany
Free Democratic Party (Germany) politicians
Members of the Bundestag 1976–1980
Members of the Bundestag 1980–1983
Members of the Bundestag 1983–1987
Members of the Bundestag 1987–1990
Members of the Bundestag 1990–1994
Members of the Bundestag 1994–1998
20th-century German politicians
1945 births
Living people